Lunan Ruben Gabrielsen (born 10 March 1992) is a Norwegian professional footballer who plays as a centre-back for Lillestrøm.

Club career

Early career
He started his career in Kapp IF, always playing with the older teams. Toten came to collect him, and went from there to Gjøvik-Lyn. After half a season on the senior team he was signed by Lillestrøm, featuring for their B team in the 2. divisjon.

Lillestrøm
On 4 April 2009 Gabrielsen became the youngest ever Lillestrøm player to debut in the Eliteserien in a game against Aalesunds at the age of 17 years and 25 days.

Molde
In July 2014, Gabrielsen joined Molde and signed a two-and-a-half-year contract with the club. He made his debut in the first leg of the UEFA Europa League third qualifying round tie against Zorya Luhansk on 31 July 2014. With Molde, Gabrielsen won a double in the 2014 season after Molde became champions of both the 2014 Tippeligaen and the 2014 Norwegian Football Cup. In February 2017, Gabrielsen extended his contract till the end of the 2019 season. In 2017, Gabrielsen succeeded Joona Toivio as club captain. After the end of the 2019 season, he left the club on a free transfer.

Toulouse
On 23 December 2019, Gabrielsen signed a three-year contract with Toulouse.

On 31 August 2021, Gabrielsen joined Danish side Copenhagen on a loan until 31 December 2021.

Austin FC
On 24 January 2022, Gabrielsen signed a two-year deal with Major League Soccer club Austin FC ahead of their 2022 season.

Return to Lillestrøm
On 5 January 2023, Gabrielsen was transferred to Lillestrøm for his second spell at the club.

International career 
Gabrielsen was born in Norway to a Cameroonian mother and Norwegian father. Gabrielsen was called up to the senior Norway squad for a friendly against Belgium in June 2016.

Career statistics

Honours
Molde FK
 Tippeligaen/Eliteserien: 2014, 2019
 Norwegian Cup: 2014
F.C. Copenhagen
 Danish Superliga: 2022

References

1992 births
Living people
People from Østre Toten
Norwegian footballers
Norwegian expatriate footballers
Norway youth international footballers
Norway under-21 international footballers
Norway international footballers
Norwegian people of Cameroonian descent
SK Gjøvik-Lyn players
Lillestrøm SK players
Molde FK players
Toulouse FC players
Austin FC players
F.C. Copenhagen players
Eliteserien players
Ligue 1 players
Ligue 2 players
Danish Superliga players
Association football defenders
Norwegian expatriate sportspeople in France
Norwegian expatriate sportspeople in Denmark
Norwegian expatriate sportspeople in the United States
Expatriate footballers in France
Expatriate men's footballers in Denmark
Expatriate soccer players in the United States
Major League Soccer players
Sportspeople from Innlandet